Hallucinogenic mushrooms are those mushrooms that have hallucinogenic effects on humans. Such mushrooms include:

 Psychoactive Amanita mushroom
 Psilocybin mushroom

See also  
 Magic mushroom (disambiguation)